Irsyad Aras (born 4 March 1979 in Polewali Mandar Regency, West Sulawesi) is an Indonesian footballer that currently plays for Persela Lamongan in the Indonesia Super League. His brother Ardan Aras is also a professional footballer, who currently plays for Mitra Kukar FC.

Club statistics

References

External links

1979 births
Association football defenders
Association football midfielders
Living people
Bugis people
Sportspeople from Makassar
Indonesian footballers
Liga 1 (Indonesia) players
Persela Lamongan players
PSM Makassar players
Persisam Putra Samarinda players
Persim Maros players
Indonesian Premier Division players
Indonesia international footballers